In Your Eyes is a 1983 album by George Benson. It is his only album produced by producer Arif Mardin. It includes the hit "Lady Love Me (One More Time)".  The title track would later be covered by Jeffrey Osborne for his 1986 album Emotional.

Track listing 

Note: Some cassette versions of the album have "Love Will Come Again" and "In Search of a Dream" extended to 6 minutes and 32 seconds and 7 minutes and 37 seconds, respectively. These versions were not included on vinyl or CD issues of the album.

Personnel 
Musicians

 George Benson – lead vocals, guitar solo (1, 2, 4, 6–8), rhythm guitar (2), backing vocals (4, 6)
 Joe Mardin – synthesizer programming
 Robbie Buchanan – electric piano (1, 4, 6, 7), synthesizers (1, 5, 6, 8, 9), Moog bass (1, 6), rhythm arrangements (1, 5, 6, 8, 9), acoustic piano (5, 9), LinnDrum programming (6)
 Jorge Dalto – acoustic piano (1), electric piano (10)
 Kashif – keyboards (2), Synclavier 2 (2), synthesizers (2), Moog bass (2), drums (2), finger snaps (2), backing vocals (2), rhythm arrangements (2)
 James Newton Howard – keyboards (3), synthesizers (3), arrangements (3), string arrangements (3)
 David Paich – keyboards (3), synthesizers (3), arrangements (3), brass arrangements (3)
 Greg Phillinganes – additional synthesizer (3)
 Steve Porcaro – additional synthesizer (3)
 Peter Cannarozzi – synthesizers (4, 10)
 Richard Tee – electric piano (5)
 David Spinozza – guitar
 Paul Jackson Jr. – rhythm guitar (1, 4, 6–8), guitar (5)
 Ira Siegel – guitar (2)
 Adam "Gus" Falcon – rhythm guitar (10), rhythm arrangements (10)
 Will Lee – bass guitar (1, 4, 5, 8, 9)
 Nathan East – bass guitar (3)
 Anthony Jackson – bass guitar (7)
 Marcus Miller – bass guitar (10)
 Steve Ferrone – drums (1, 6, 9)
 Leslie Ming – drums (2)
 Jeff Porcaro – drums (3)
 Carlos Vega – drums (4, 7, 8)
 Steve Gadd – drums (5)
 Steve Jordan – drums (10)
 Sammy Figueroa – percussion (1, 4)
 Bashiri Johnson – percussion (2)
 Stephen Benben – finger snaps (2)
 Lenny Castro – percussion (3)
 Michael Brecker – tenor saxophone (1, 6, 10)
 Lew Del Gatto – baritone saxophone (1, 6, 10)
 David Sanborn – alto saxophone (6)
 Tom Malone – trombone (1, 3, 6, 10)
 Alan Raph – trombone (1, 3, 6, 10)
 Randy Brecker – trumpet (1, 3, 6, 10), horn arrangements (1, 6)
 Jon Faddis – trumpet (1, 3, 6, 10)
 Jerry Hey – flugelhorn (3), brass arrangements (3)
 Paul Lawrence Jones III – vocal arrangements (2)
 Marty Paich – string arrangements (3)
 Lee Holdridge – string arrangements (5)
 Arif Mardin – BGV arrangements (6), rhythm arrangements (6), string arrangements (7, 9), synthesizer arrangements (8), horn arrangements  (10)
 Endre Granat – concertmaster (3, 5, 7, 9)
 Gene Orloff – concertmaster (3, 5, 7, 9)
 Jonathan Abramowitz – strings (3, 5, 7, 9)
 Julien Barber – strings (3, 5, 7, 9)
 Alfred Brown – strings (3, 5, 7, 9)
 Frederick Buldrini – strings (3, 5, 7, 9)
 Ted Hoyle – strings (3, 5, 7, 9)
 Harold Kohon – strings (3, 5, 7, 9)
 Harry Lookofsky – strings (3, 5, 7, 9)
 Guy Lumia – strings (3, 5, 7, 9)
 Joe Malin – strings (3, 5, 7, 9)
 Richard Maximoff – strings (3, 5, 7, 9)
 Gerald Tarack – strings (3, 5, 7, 9)
 Emanuel Vardi – strings (3, 5, 7, 9)
 Marilyn Wright – strings (3, 5, 7, 9)
 Richard Young – strings (3, 5, 7, 9)
 Fred Zlotkin – strings (3, 5, 7, 9)
 Mark Stevens – backing vocals
 B.J. Nelson – backing vocals (2)
 Brenda White King – backing vocals (2)
 Lillo Thomas – backing vocals (2)
 Babi Floyd – backing vocals (3)
 Hamish Stuart – backing vocals (3, 6), BGV arrangements (6)
 Zachary Sanders – backing vocals (3)
 Chaka Khan – backing vocals (4)
 Diva Gray – backing vocals (8)
 Lani Groves – backing vocals (8)
 Robin Clark – backing vocals (8)
 Vicki Randle – lead vocals (9)

Technical

 Arif Mardin – producer
 Kashif – co-producer (2)
 Jeremy Smith – engineer (1–2, 4–10), mixing (1, 3–10), post tracking 
 Michael O'Reilly – assistant engineer, mixing (1–10), engineer (2), post tracking
 John Agallo – additional recording
 Danny Caccavo – additional recording
 Bill Dooley – additional recording
 Jay Messina – additional recording
 Bobby Warner – additional recording
 Stephen Benben – assistant engineer (2), assistant tracking
 Gary Skardina – engineer (3)
 Randy Burns – assistant engineer (3)
 Robert Feist – assistant engineer (3)
 Dan Nash – post tracking
 Julie Last – tracking assistant 
 George Marino – mastering at Sterling Sound (New York, NY)
 Chrissy Allerdings – project coordination
 Frank DeCaro – project coordination
 Lu Sneed – project coordination
 Simon Levy – art direction
 Laura LiPuma – design 
 Jean Pagliusso – photography 
 Quiet Fire – hair, make-up
 Beverly Silver – stylist

Charts

Weekly charts

Year-end charts

Certifications

References

1983 albums
George Benson albums
Albums arranged by Marty Paich
Albums arranged by Lee Holdridge
Albums produced by Arif Mardin
Warner Records albums
Albums recorded at United Western Recorders